Biscayne Point is a neighborhood of North Beach in the city of Miami Beach, Florida.  It is located just west of the main island that the city occupies, in the area of the city referred to as North Beach.  It is actually on three islands, just north of Normandy Shores.  Bridges connect the three islands which are accessible from 77th Street and from 85th Street by vehicles and a from a pedestrian bridge at 80th Street.

Two public parks are available. The northern one is Stillwater Park and the southern is Crespi Park.

Education

Miami-Dade County Public Schools is the local school district. Biscayne Beach Elementary School is the local elementary school. Miami Beach Nautilus Middle School and Miami Beach Senior High School serve North Bay Village.

References

Neighborhoods in Miami Beach, Florida
Islands of Miami Beach, Florida
Populated places on the Intracoastal Waterway in Florida